The Donkeys were a partisan force during the Korean War that consisted of anti-communist North Korean defectors who engaged in guerrilla warfare. The fighters were formed under the United Nations Partisan Infantry Forces. Guerrillas had a huge impact on the United States effort in North Korea. In the end, these partisan forces conducted 4,445 actions in North Korea that led to the capture of 950 prisoners, 5,000 weapons, 2,700 destroyed vehicles, 80 bridges demolished, 69,000 casualties (dead and wounded), 3,189 guerrilla deaths, and only four American advisers were KIA. Furthermore, according to the 5th Air Force, of the 93 pilots who had been shot down and evaded capture between July 1950 and January 1952, guerrilla fighters rescued 29.

Origins 
During the Korean War, Major General Charles Willoughby had been receiving unconfirmed reports of a guerrilla resistance. It was not until Jan. 8, 1951, when the U.S. Eighth Army found roughly 10,000 partisans in the Hwanghae Province. These fighters had withdrawn to the Hwange Province after China entered the war and the forces of the United Nations had withdrawn.

Once this intelligence had been confirmed, Colonel John McGee was sent to manage a partisan operation. After receiving a report from Major William Burke that partisan groups occupied five islands, Colonel McGee made a plan that these partisan groups would be trained and equipped by Americans. These partisan groups, as described by Colonel McGee, "were a colorful group of fighters ranging in age from youths to elderly men."

Once these groups became organized, they called themselves "donkeys." There are three ideas as to the origin of the name. One theory is that a donkey symbolizes traits of their force like sturdy, patient and mean. Another theory is based on the Korean word "dong-li" which means "liberty." A third idea is that they supposedly looked like they were riding donkeys when they operated a crank-driven generator.

Guerrilla Activities 
The Eighth Army took the guerrilla fighters and organized them into the "Donkey" squads in early 1951. These squads were organized on islands that, luckily, was a strategic advantage. The islands were behind enemy lines but were protected by the UN naval blockade and ROK garrisons from any enemy attack. There were five main  activities that happened on these islands:
 Leopard Base 
 Wolfpack 
 Kirkland 
 Baker Section 
 Tactical Liaison Office

Leopard Base 
Operating from the Yalu River south of the Ongin Peninsula, Leopard Base (originally part of "Task Force William Able") was the headquarters for 11 guerrilla units. This area along the west coast of North Korea had around 400 islands and roughly seventy percent of these islands were under the control of the guerrilla forces. These were strategic for spring boarding into the North.

Notable Missions 
 Donkey 1 on March 3, 1951
 Donkey 4 on July 13, 1952

Wolfpack 
This was the headquarters for 10,000 guerrillas which were operating south to Inchon. This was also originally part of "Task Force William Able" was also on the west coast.

Kirkland 
Organized in April 1951, Kirkland was composed of 300 guerrillas led by the CIA and Army on two islands east of the mainland. This partisan force operated in the area Wonsan south for missions led by the Army and in the north for missions by the CIA. These missions included collecting intelligence, identifying targets for Navy gunfire and air operations, and to conduct coastal raids. The base was not utilized very much during the war, for, at its peak, 4,844 partisans and 32 American advisers operated on the island.

Baker Section 
Baker Section was known for training guerrillas to be paratroopers so they could collect intelligence and conduct operations behind enemy lines. These operations were intended to take out Chinese and North Korean resources as well as establish guerrilla bases. By the time the war ended, Baker Section had conducted 19 airborne operations that involved around 389 guerrilla partisans. The missions were mostly unsuccessful, and consider futile after the war.

Notable Missions 
Operation Virginia: This mission was the first airborne operation conducted by the Baker Section. Beginning on the night of March 15, 1951, four Americans and 20 Koreans were dropped 30 miles inland from the Sea of Japan. The mission, which was to destroy railroad, was considered a complete failure for a plethora of reasons. A blizzard delayed the team's arrival, the team missed their drop zone,  and when they called for an extraction one of the three helicopters were shot down.

Tactical Liaison Office 
For every U.S. infantry division, roughly 25 guerrillas were trained by special forces. At any time, up to nine of these guerrillas would go into North Korea wearing North Korean uniforms equipped with weapons and ID cards. Their objective was to gather intelligence while behind enemy lines. The Tactical Liaison Office was simply a cover name for the North Korean "line crossers." These operations were successful for they ran for two years without being compromised.

"Donkey" Squads 
Donkey One: First "Donkey" squad to return to mainland North Korea. On March 3, 1951, under the leadership of Chang Jae Hwa - a former merchant - 37 partisans moved to Hwang-ju and Sari-won in order to receive information on enemy movements. The results of this mission were 280 enemies killed and telephone wires and railroad links cut.

Donkey Four ("White Tigers"): Donkey Four was a band of 4,000 guerrilla units under the leadership of, in 1952 lieutenant, Colonel Ben S. Malcom. On July 13, 1952, Pak Chol asked 1st Lieutenant Malcom that they needed to take out a 76 mm gun the North Koreans were using to harass the partisan base located at Wollae-do. This mission was a success, for they destroyed the gun and only lost six partisans and had seven others wounded. This mission showed that North Korea was not invulnerable.

See also 
 Korean War
 Guerrilla Warfare
 North Korea
 "White Tigers"

Books 
"White Tigers: My Secret War in North Korea" by Ben S. Malcom
"Darkmoon: Eighth Army Special Operations in the Korean War" by Ed Evanhoe
"Shadow Warriors: The Covert War in Korea" by William B. Breuer

References 

Korean War
Guerrilla warfare